BharatQR, developed by NPCI, Mastercard, and Visa, is an integrated payment system in India for mobile devices. The system, which was launched in September 2016, facilitates users to transfer their money from one source to another. The money transferred through BharatQR is received directly in the user's linked bank account. It provides a common interface between RuPay, Mastercard, Visa and American Express, and is interoperable with all the banks. Currently, BharatQR is supported on both Android and iOS devices.

Overview
BharatQR was launched in September 2016 as per the directions set by the Reserve Bank of India with the aim of facilitating India in transition to a less-cash society. The system helps in enabling digital payments to reduce the usage of card machines for payment. A number of banks supported BharatQR, before the system was launched, and got ready to deploy it.

Although, BharatQR primarily works by scanning QR codes, it is not the only way to make payments. It allows users to pay through Aadhaar number, UPI payment address or through account number and IFSC code, thus, minimizing the need to pay using debit and credit cards which are, supposedly, less secure than BharatQR. The system also supports Dynamic QR code generation which eliminates the need to enter the amount for payment.

This payment system supports RuPay, Mastercard, Visa, American Express and payment systems of 14 other national banks. Multiple cards can be linked to BharatQR supported bank apps and users can select any one of them to handle transactions conveniently for bank customers, partners, and merchants. BharatQR enables faster & secure mode of transactions with Immediate Payment Service (IMPS). There is no need to share mobile number or account details, or your CVV with anyone.

NPCI, Mastercard and Visa developed BharatQR with provisions for three additional fields: bank account and IFS (Indian Financial System) code, Unified Payments Interface (UPI) and Aadhaar. These additional fields provide banks the option to populate them as QR-based payments scale in the country. American Express is also on board to adopt these standards.

Usage 
Bijlipay became the first Indian Point-of-Sale (PoS) devices-providing company to use BharatQR on the screen of PoS machines.

ItzCash announced rolling-out Bharat QR code features across its retail network to scan and pay money with ItzCash's Point-of-Sale devices by presenting a cell phone to a reader, across its network of 75,000 outlets in 3,000 cities and towns across the India.

Samsung Pay, which earlier in 2017, integrated Samsung Pay mobile wallet with Unified Payments Interface, integrated BharatQR to pay at merchants supporting UPI payment system.

By early 2018, Delhi Metro Rail Corporation (DMRC) is planning to introduce BharatQR code enabled AFC gates at all stations of the Airport Express Line allowing passengers to use the system while using the Line. Two entry points at Lal Qila metro station and two exit points at Jama Masjid metro station are set by DMRC providing commuters to enter and exit using QR codes.

References 

2016 establishments in India
Mobile payments in India
Electronic funds transfer